The Sam Houston Bearkats softball team represents Sam Houston State University in NCAA Division I college softball.  The team participates in the Western Athletic Conference. The Bearkats are currently led by head coach Garrett Valis. The team plays its home games at the Bearkat Softball Complex located on the university's campus.

History

Early history (1980–1990)
Sam Houston softball first began in 1980. The team was immediately successful as it saw a 19-5 record in its very first season. In only its second season, the team captured its first of three national titles in the 1981 NAIA national softball championship with a 1-0 victory over the Emporia State Lady Hornets. Beginning with the 1982 season, the Bearkats moved up to NCAA Division II but saw no signs of slowing down as they earned three straight DII College World Series berths, with another national title in 1982. Following their third consecutive WCWS season in 1983, SHSU softball continued to win, and reached DII regionals the next two years. In 1987, the team failed to make a regional appearance despite a successful 34-26 campaign. This was the first season the softball team did not reach the playoffs since the team's first year. In the 1988 season, the Bearkats were invited to play in the Southland Conference, where the softball team reached the conference tournament in the next three years, including two conference championship seasons.

Rebuilding (1991–2001)
Throughout the early part of the '90s the softball team continued to be a force, earning at least a top 2 conference finish through the 1993 season. In 1993, Sam Houston would win the last of its three claimed national titles, winning the Women's NIT softball tournament. After this successful season, however, the program would begin its run of mediocrity and never saw a top 4 conference finish again until current head coach Bob Brock took over in 2002.

The Bob Brock era (2002–present)
Bearkat Softball had never seen as much stability in the head coach position as it has since 2002, as Bob Brock is still the most tenured coach in Sam Houston's history. In Bob Brock's 14 seasons, he coached the softball team to 9 Southland Tournament berths. The 2012 season was his most successful as the Bearkats lost a thriller to Northwestern State in the conference title game.

Year-by-year results

Postseason appearances

Conference tournaments
Sources:

NCAA Division I Tournament results
The Bearkats have appeared in one NCAA Division I Tournaments. Their combined record is 1–2.

Source:

NIT Division I Tournament results
In 1993, the Bearkats appeared in the Division I NIT softball tournament. They won the tournament championship with a record of 3–0.

Source:

See also
List of NCAA Division I softball programs

References

External links